Oliver "Tuku" Mtukudzi (22 September 1952 – 23 January 2019) was a Zimbabwean musician, businessman, philanthropist, human rights activist and UNICEF Goodwill Ambassador for Southern Africa Region.

Career 

Mtukudzi grew up in Highfield, a poor neighborhood in Salisbury (modern-day Harare) in Southern Rhodesia. He began performing in 1977 when he joined the Wagon Wheels, a band that also featured Thomas Mapfumo and fellow guitarist James Chimombe. They were given the rare opportunity by Paul Tangi Mhova Mkondo, an African nationalist and music promotor, who provided money and resources to the group. He allowed them to perform at Club Mutanga (Pungwe) which, at the time, was the only night club available for blacks under Rhodesia's policy of segregation. Their single Dzandimomotera went gold and Tuku's first album followed, which was also a major success. Mtukudzi was also a contributor to Mahube, Southern Africa's "supergroup".

With his husky voice, Mtukudzi became the most recognised voice to emerge from Zimbabwe and onto the international scene and he earned a devoted following across Africa and beyond. A member of Zimbabwe's KoreKore group, with Nzou Samanyanga as his totem, he sang in the nation's dominant Shona language along with Ndebele and English. He also incorporated elements of different musical traditions, giving his music a distinctive style, known to fans as Tuku Music.  

Mtukudzi had a number of tours around the world. He was on several tours in the UK, US and Canada to perform for large audiences. In 2017 Mtukudzi entertained guests at the wedding of Zimbabwean businessman Wicknell Chivayo.

Social commentary 
Prior to the independence of Zimbabwe, Mtukudzi's music depicted the struggles under Rhodesian white minority rule. In subsequent years following Zimbabwean independence, his music has advocated for tolerance and peace and has frequently portrayed the struggles of women and children.

Personal life and death 
Mtukudzi was the father of five children and had two grandchildren. Two of his children are also musicians. His son Sam Mtukudzi, a successful musician in his own right, died in a car accident in March 2010 and in 2013, Mtukudzi released an album titled "Sarawoga", in tribute to his son.

On 23 January 2019, Mtukudzi died at the age of 66 at Avenues Clinic in Harare, Zimbabwe after a long battle with diabetes mellitus.

Discography 

1978 Ndipeiwo Zano (re-released 2000)
1979 Chokwadi Chichabuda
1979 Muroi Ndiani?
1980 Africa (re-released 2000)
1981 Shanje
1981 Pfambi
1982 Maungira
1982 Please Ndapota
1983 Nzara
1983 Oliver's Greatest Hits
1984 Hwema Handirase
1985 Mhaka
1986 Gona
1986 Zvauya Sei?
1987 Wawona
1988 Nyanga Nyanga 
1988 Strange, Isn't It?
1988 Sugar Pie
1989 Grandpa Story
1990 Chikonzi
1990 Pss Pss Hallo!
1990 Shoko
1991 Mutorwa
1992 Rombe
1992 Rumbidzai Jehova
1992 Neria soundtrack
1993 Son of Africa
1994 Ziwere MuKobenhavn
1995 Was My Child
1996 Svovi yangu
1995 The Other Side: Live in Switzerland
1995 Ivai Navo
1997 Ndega Zvangu (re-released 2001)
1997 Chinhamwe
1998 Dzangu Dziye
1999 Tuku Music
2000 Paivepo
2001 Neria
2001 Bvuma ("Tolerance")
2002 Shanda soundtrack
2002 Vhunze Moto
2003 Shanda  (Alula Records)
2003 Tsivo ("Revenge")
2004 Greatest Hits Tuku Years
2004 Mtukudzi Collection 1991–1997
2004 Mtukudzi Collection 1984–1991
2005 Nhava
2006 Wonai
2007 Tsimba Itsoka
2008 Dairai (Believe)
2010 Rudaviro
2010 Kutsi Kwemoyo (compilation)
2011 Rudaviro
2011 Abi'angu ("Duets of My Time")
2012 Sarawoga — Sarawoga laments the losses that the legend has had to endure in his life, not least the loss of life. Thus he has been left 'alone' in a sense, hence the title Sarawoga (left alone).
2014 Mukombe Wemvura
2016 God Bless You – The Gospel Collection
2016 Eheka! Nhai Yahwe
2018 hany'a ("Concern")

Contributing artist 
 1996 The Rough Guide to the Music of Zimbabwe (World Music Network)
 1999 Unwired: Acoustic Music from Around the World (World Music Network)
 2000 Unwired: Africa (World Music Network)

Filmography 
 Jit (dir. Michael Raeburn, 1990)
Neria (dir. Goodwin Mawuru, written by Tsitsi Dangarembga, 1993). Mtukudzi starred in the movie and made the soundtrack.
 Shanda (dir. John and Louise Riber, 2002, rev. 2004)
 Sarawoga, 2009, was written by Elias C. Machemedze, directed by Watson Chidzomba and produced by Oliver Mtukudzi, who also did the soundtrack for the film.
2012 Nzou NeMhuru Mudanga DVD, the live recording of a show, a theatrical performance which Tuku had with his son just weeks before his death.

Awards 
 An honorary degree from the University of Zimbabwe in December 2003
 M-Net Best Soundtrack Award in 1992, for Neria

References 

1952 births
2019 deaths
20th-century Zimbabwean male singers
Heads Up International artists
People from Harare
21st-century Zimbabwean male singers
Knights of the Order of Merit of the Italian Republic
UNICEF Goodwill Ambassadors
Label Bleu artists